"Chances" is a song by American boy band Backstreet Boys. It was released on November 9, 2018, as the second single from DNA, their ninth studio album (eighth in the United States). The song was written by Shawn Mendes, Fiona Bevan, Casey Smith, Geoff Warburton, Scott Harris, and producers Ryan Tedder and Zach Skelton. "Chances" peaked at number nine on the Billboard Dance Club Songs chart, and number 19 on the Adult Top 40. An accompanying music video was directed by McLean and René Elizondo Jr., and depicts two dancers performing inside Union Station.

Background and composition
AJ McLean first met Ryan Tedder in 2003, where they worked together on the Backstreet Boys' 2009 studio album This Is Us and the former musician's debut studio album Have It All (2010). After several years, McLean suggested Tedder to send several of his written songs to the Backstreet Boys. One of the songs included "Chances", which the band immediately gravitated towards. It was written by Shawn Mendes, Fiona Bevan, Casey Smith, Geoff Warburton, Scott Harris, and producers Tedder, and Zach Skelton. The song and accompanying music video were simultaneously released on November 9, 2018, which followed the announcement of the DNA World Tour.

"Chances" is a pop song. Fist-pumping synthesizers are consistently used as the Backstreet Boys ponder over the chorus, "What are the chances that we'd end up dancing? Like 2 in a million, like once in a life". In an interview with Billboard in 2018, McLean explained that "Chances" is similar to their previous 2018 single, "Don't Go Breaking My Heart", but acknowledged that it also felt distinct. He described the lyrics as "more of that realistic love story about chance, to find that person in the most precarious of scenarios". However, Backstreet Boys member Brian Littrell stated that "both songs are completely different" in a 2019 interview with Entertainment Weekly.

Critical reception and commercial performance
Mike Wass of Idolator described "Chances" as "another irresistible, vaguely retro pop-anthem" containing perfect vocal harmonies. Neil Z. Yeung of AllMusic praised "Chances" and "Don't Go Breaking My Heart", stating that both songs are "some of Backstreet's finest, familiar in their delivery yet with a finger on the mainstream pulse of 2019". Writing for Rolling Stone, Jon Dolan stated that the song is "plaintively throbbing". Josh Hurst of Flood Magazine referred to "Chances" as "slightly anthemic", but not jarring.

"Chances" peaked at number seven on the US Billboard Bubbling Under Hot 100 on November 24, 2018. The song also reached number nine on the US Dance Club Songs on the chart dated March 9, 2019, as well as number 19 on the Adult Top 40 chart dated January 26, 2019. It peaked on the Canadian Hot 100 at number 55, and was certified gold by Music Canada (MC) for selling over 40,000 equivalent-sales units in Canada. "Chances" charted at number 63 on the Official German Charts, and at number 82 on the Schweizer Hitparade in Switzerland.

Music video

Background

The "Chances" music video was simultaneously distributed with the digital release of the song on November 9, 2018. The video was co-directed by McLean and René Elizondo Jr., and was the former's first music video directed for the Backstreet Boys. It was filmed inside Union Station in Los Angeles during public hours, and was the first music video where all five members wore suits. Elizondo wanted it to be cinematic and showcase elements of film noir.

The music video was filmed from 2:00pm to 4:00am on September 4, 2018. The dancers featured in the video are Madison Vomastek and Jake Tribus, both students from the Glorya Kaufman School of Dance at the University of Southern California. Their scenes were shot from 3:00pm to 5:00pm, and the Backstreet Boys were designated inside the train carriage at 3:00am. Both Vomastek and Tribus performed an uninterrupted choreographed sequence that was positively received by the band, their label, and management.

Synopsis
The video begins as a woman runs down the steps of a train station. She helps another woman pick up a bag that she dropped, as a man in front of her misses the train. As she continues to walk by, the man follows her throughout the station until they sit opposite each other on the station seats. The duo perform a dance in the ticket lobby, which they conclude with a kiss and sit facing away from each other on the station seats. The Backstreet Boys appear throughout the video during each sequence, as they are seen behind a pole, inside the moving train, and seated on the station seats adjacent from them.

Live performances
The Backstreet Boys performed "Chances" on the 15th season of The Voice on November 13, 2018. They also appeared on The Tonight Show Starring Jimmy Fallon in chicken costumes on January 24, 2019 while they performed "Everybody (Backstreet's Back)" on the Manhattan streets and Rockefeller sidewalks, before performing "Chances" in matching black and gray outfits. The song was also included on the setlist of the DNA World Tour, which supported their studio album DNA.

Track listings

Digital download – Remixes

Digital download – Mark Ralph Remix

Credits and personnel
Credits adapted from the liner notes of DNA.

 Backstreet Boys vocals
 Ryan Tedder producer, songwriting, programming
 Zach Skelton producer, songwriting, drums, guitar, keyboard, programming
 Shawn Mendes songwriting
 Fiona Bevan songwriting
 Casey Smith songwriting, background vocals
 Geoff Warburton songwriting
 Scott Harris songwriting
 Serban Ghenea mixing
 John Hanes mix engineer
 Scott Kelly assistant engineer
 Rich Rich engineer
 Simone Torres engineer
 Kuk Harrell vocal producer

Charts

Certifications

Release history

References

2018 songs
2018 singles
Backstreet Boys songs
Songs written by Ryan Tedder
Songs written by Shawn Mendes
Songs written by Zach Skelton
Songs written by Fiona Bevan
Songs written by Geoff Warburton
Song recordings produced by Ryan Tedder